"R.O.C.K. in the U.S.A.", subtitled "A Salute to 60's Rock", is a rock song written and performed by John Mellencamp. It was the third single from his 1985 album Scarecrow and a top-ten hit on both the Billboard Hot 100 and Top Rock Tracks charts, peaking at number 2 and number 6 respectively. In Australia, the single effectively became a double-A side when the B-side "Under the Boardwalk" received significant airplay and both tracks were listed together on the singles chart, reaching #18.

Background and recording
According to Mellencamp biography Born in a Small Town, Mellencamp was initially reluctant to include "R.O.C.K. in the U.S.A." on Scarecrow, feeling the song was too light-hearted to include alongside the otherwise grim songs such as "Rain on the Scarecrow" and "Face of the Nation". Mellencamp told Timothy White in a 1986 article for the Illinois Entertainer of his decision to include "R.O.C.K. in the U.S.A." on Scarecrow: "It was one of those absolute last-split-second decisions. I was only including it on the cassette and CD copies of Scarecrow as a bonus party track, but my manager loved the energy of it and I thought, 'Yeah! What the hell!'"

Mellencamp required his band to learn how to play about 100 songs from the 1960s before recording Scarecrow, and the song includes several direct musical references to 1960s songs, including The Troggs' "Wild Thing".

The song was recorded at Belmont Mall in Belmont, Indiana. The recording was produced by Mellencamp (under the alias "Little Bastard") and Don Gehman, engineered by Gehman and Greg Edward; backing Mellencamp on the recording were Kenny Aronoff (drums), Toby Myers (bass), Mike Wanchic (guitars, background vocals), Larry Crane (guitars, flutophone), John Cascella (keyboards), and Sarah Flint (background vocals).

Reception
Cash Box called it a "no-holds-barred rocker."  Billboard said that it "evokes, without quite quoting, reference points from 'La Bamba' to '96 Tears.'"

Chart performance

Weekly charts

Year-end charts

Music video
A music video for the single was released in 1986. The video was directed by Mellencamp and Faye Cummings, and it was filmed using a kinescope camera. It featured an African American-vocal group and a Caucasian-instrumental group with the two groups playing together at the end of the video.

In popular culture

During George W. Bush's first presidential campaign, "R.O.C.K. in the U.S.A." was played at a campaign event. While Mellencamp had denied the request of President Ronald Reagan to use "Pink Houses" as a campaign song in 1984, he expressed reluctance to object to Bush's use of "R.O.C.K. in the U.S.A." at the event, telling Rolling Stone that despite his opposition to Bush's political positions, "I don't see any sense in being silly about it. It's entertainment. It's a song."

In 1994, the song was also used during the 1994 USA World Cup, when announcing the United States as one of the teams who qualified. 

"R.O.C.K. in the U.S.A." has appeared on a number of Mellencamp compilations, including 1997's The Best That I Could Do 1978–1988 and 2004's Words & Music: John Mellencamp's Greatest Hits.

The song was also featured in The Simpsons episode "Eight Misbehavin' during the scene where Apu and Majula's octuplets were being used in a zoo show.

References 

1986 songs
1986 singles
John Mellencamp songs
Riva Records singles
Songs written by John Mellencamp
Song recordings produced by Don Gehman
Songs about rock music